Boston Scientific Corporation ("BSC"), incorporated in Delaware, is a biomedical/biotechnology engineering firm and multinational manufacturer of medical devices used in interventional medical specialties, including interventional radiology, interventional cardiology, peripheral interventions, neuromodulation, neurovascular intervention, electrophysiology, cardiac surgery, vascular surgery, endoscopy, oncology, urology and gynecology. Boston Scientific is widely known for the development of the Taxus Stent, a drug-eluting stent which is used to open clogged arteries. With the full acquisition of Cameron Health in June 2012, the company also became notable for offering a minimally invasive implantable cardioverter-defibrillator (ICD) which they call the EMBLEM subcutaneous implantable defibrillator (S-ICD).

History 
Boston Scientific was formed  years ago, on June 29, 1979, in Watertown, Massachusetts, as a holding company for the medical products company, Medi-Tech, Inc., and to position the company for growth in interventional medicine. Medi-Tech was the brainchild of Itzhak Bentov, a Czech-born emigre to Israel and then to the United States, who worked at the Arthur D. Little think tank in Cambridge, Massachusetts, and ran a contract research company from his rented house in Belmont, Massachusetts, a venture he founded in 1965 with a business friend, Dan Singer. In 1967 he was asked by Boston Beth Israel Hospital radiologists to design a steerable, remotely controlled catheter; a series of engineering designs, polymer improvements and prototypes led to the release of a new steerable angiography catheter in 1969. That year John Abele joined the small company with an option to buy, and a year later he exercised his option with Cooper Labs as a business partner, and the operation was moved – out of Bentov's lab in the basement of the rectory of a Catholic church in Belmont – to Watertown. After a decade of steady growth, by chance Abele met Pete Nicholas in their neighborhood in Concord, Massachusetts. Their partnership hinged on Nicholas' goal to build business enterprises and Abele's predilection for the vision and potential in noninvasive surgical instrumentation; they gathered backers in the Boston banking community to buy out the Cooper Labs interest and form the new corporation.

Less than a year later Kimray Medical Associates (later Mansfield Scientific, Inc.) was acquired, adding vena cava filters and cardiac output computers to the product line. By 1982 a renovated mill building in Watertown was transformed into a manufacturing plant. Acquisitions continued, with Endo-Tech (Microvasive, Inc.: gastrointestinal and pulmonary) in 1981 and then Van-Tec (urology) in 1988, and an international presence was expanded. Mansfield Scientific, Microvasive, and Medi-Tech merged into Boston Scientific December 31, 1988.

Initial public offering (1992) 
 years ago – May 19, 1992 – Boston Scientific launched an initial public offering of 23.5 million shares, of which, 18.8 million were offered in the U.S. and 4.7 million were offered outside the U.S. The initial offering amounted to 23% of Boston Scientific's outstanding stock. The opening price was $17 per share. Goldman, Sachs & Co. (lead) and PaineWebber Inc. were the underwriters and Abbott Laboratories held a 20% stake (23.5 million shares). The market capitalization was about $1.6 billion (equivalent to about $ billion in ). The U.S. shares were listed on the New York Stock Exchange.

Post–IPO 

From 1995 through 1997, Boston Scientific increased its technology R&D and product offerings following several substantial acquisitions that included Cardiovascular Imaging Systems (intravascular ultrasound), SCIMED (cardiovascular), Vesica Medical (urology), Meadox (textile vascular prostheses), EP Technologies (cardiac ablation controllers), MinTec (abdominal aortic aneurysm grafts), Symbiosis Corporation (specialty medical product manufacture), and Target Therapeutics (on neurology). Boston Scientific acquired Target Therapeutics in a tax-free stock swap for about $1.1 billion, more than 10 times Target's earnings, in contrast to the usual multiple of 10 times earnings.

The Taxus Stent was approved in 2003 in Europe and other countries and, in the United States, by the FDA in March 2004. It was the second drug-eluting stent approved in the United States.

In April 2004 the company announced that it had exercised an exclusive option to acquire Precision Vascular Systems, Inc., as part of a series of agreements between Boston Scientific and Precision Vascular in 2002 – for an undisclosed sum. In June Boston acquired Advanced Bionics Corporation for $740 million in cash, plus earn out payments. In December Boston completed its acquisition of Advanced Stent Technologies, Inc., for $120 million payable in Boston Scientific stock, plus the possibility of future contingent payments. AST had been developing stent and stent delivery systems specifically designed to address the anatomical needs of coronary artery disease in bifurcated vessels.

In April 2005, Boston exercised an exclusive option to acquire TriVascular, Inc., for an undisclosed sum and renamed it as Boston Scientific Santa Rosa Corporation, or BSSR. TriVascular was founded in January 1998 to develop less-invasive medical devices and procedures for treating abdominal aortic aneurysms, but BSC discontinued its endovascular aortic repair (EVAR) program in 2006. Also, in April 2005, BSC announced it had exercised its option to acquire CryoVascular Systems, Inc., and its proprietary angioplasty device to treat atherosclerotic disease of the legs and other peripheral arteries. In June Boston Scientific announced that its wholly owned subsidiary, Nemo I Acquisition, Inc., had successfully acquired Salt Lake City-based Rubicon Medical Corporation, with Rubicon became a wholly owned subsidiary of Boston Scientific.

In March 2008, BSC sold BSSR to TV2 Holding Company of Santa Rosa. Terms of the sale include $30 million in cash paid at the closing to BSC and a warrant allowing BSC to purchase a minority interest in TV2.

Guidant merger
In January 2006, the company announced an offer for its longtime competitor, Guidant, for $72 per share or $25 billion. The offer, however, was rejected. On April 21, 2006, BSC acquired Guidant for $27.2 billion. Guidant was split between BSC and Abbott Laboratories. Four years later, in 2010, when moving its heart-rhythm business from its acquisition of Guidant, Boston Scientific eliminated 1300 jobs.

Post-merger
In December 2007, Boston Scientific announced it would sell its Fluid Management and Venous Access businesses for $425 million to Avista Capital Partners.

In April 2008, the company acquired CryoCor, Inc., for $1.35 per share, $17.6 million in total. Navilyst Medical was formed in February 2008 from Boston Scientific's Fluid Management and Vascular Access business units.

In January 2009, Boston announced it would acquire Labcoat Limited, whose primary development was that of a development-stage drug-eluting stent – for an undisclosed sum.

In October 2010, the company was fined $600,000 by the US Department of Justice for paying a US Army doctor to use their devices and recommend them to others. In the same month Boston Scientific acquired Asthmatx, Inc., for $193.5 million, with payments of up to $250 million being paid on the achievement of specified revenue-based criteria through 2019.

In January 2011, Boston acquired Atritech, Inc., for $100 million plus additional potential payments of up to $275 million. Atritech developed a novel device called the Watchman® designed to close the left atrial appendage in patients with atrial fibrillation who are at risk for ischemic stroke. In the same month, Boston Scientific acquired Intelect Medical, Inc., for $78 million and the remaining 86% of Sadra Medical, Inc., not already owned for $193 million plus contingent payments. At the same time, the business divested its neurovascular business to Stryker Corporation for $1.5 billion.

In June 2012, Boston Scientific officially acquired Cameron Health for a total sum of $1.3 billion, paid out incrementally as various revenue milestones were achieved. In September the company announced it would acquire BridgePoint Medical, Inc., developer of a catheter-based system to treat coronary chronic total occlusions. In October, the company acquired Rhythmia Medical, Inc., developer of mapping and navigation methods for use in cardiac catheter ablations and other electrophysiology procedures.  A month later the business acquired catheter-based renal denervation system developer, Vessix Vascular, Inc.

In November 2013, Boston announced it would acquire Bard EP, the electrophysiology business of C.R. Bard, Inc., for $275 million.

In May 2014, Boston acquired hysteroscopic intrauterine tissue removal specialist, IoGyn, Inc. In September, the business announced it would acquire the Interventional business of Bayer.

In March 2015, the company announced it would acquire Endo International Plc's American Medical Systems urology business for at least $1.6 billion, expanding the company's health and prostate treatments. In April, Boston announced its intention to acquire Xlumena, Inc. In October Boston announced it had invested further in percutaneous mitral valve replacement system developer, MValve Technologies, gaining a right to acquire the business in the future.

As of 2016, it operates in more than 100 countries, employs more than 24,000 people, and manufactures around 13,000 diverse products. In July 2016 the business acquired the manufacturer of radiofrequency ablation systems, Cosman Medical, Inc. In September, Boston announced it had acquired EndoChoice Holdings, Inc., becoming part of the Boston Scientific Endoscopy business for $8.00 per share or $210 million in total. In November the company acquired the gynecology and urology portfolio of Distal Access, LLC, a company that designs minimally invasive medical devices. In December 2016, the business acquired a 15% stake in Neovasc, Inc., for $75 million.

In May 2017, the company acquired Symetis SA, a developer of minimally invasive transcatheter aortic valve implantation devices. In October Boston acquired Apama Medical Inc. for up to $300 million.

In April 2018, Boston Scientific announced the triple closure of its acquisitions of women's health company, nVision Medical Corporation, NxThera and Securus Medical Group, Inc., for up to $50 million. In July, Boston Scientific announced it would acquire Cryterion Medical, Inc, Veniti, Inc., in August Augmenix, Inc., and Claret Medical, Inc. and in October In late November Boston announce they would acquire UK medical device maker, BTG plc, for $4.2 billion. BTG, before being acquired, was publicly traded and a constituent of the FTSE 250 Index. In late December, the company announced it would acquire Millipede, Inc for $325 million – after previously investing $90 million in the company.

In May 2019, the company announced it would acquire Vertiflex, Inc., with the aim of increasing its interventional pain therapy offerings. Vertiflex principally developed treatment for lumbar spinal stenosis.

In January 2021, Boston announced it would acquire Minneapolis-based Preventice Solutions, Inc., and its portfolio of mobile cardiac health solutions for up to $1.2 billion. In March, the business announced it would acquire Lumenis Ltd. for $1 billion from an affiliate of Baring Private Equity Asia, who, in 2019, had acquired it from XIO Group. In June, the company announced it would acquire the 73% of Farapulse, Inc., it did not already own, for $295 million. Farapulse was a University of Iowa startup. The deal complimented Boston Scientific's existing electrophysiology portfolio. In September, the business announced it would acquire Devoro Medical, Inc., and its blood clot capturing technology. Boston Scientific had been a strategic investor in Devoro since 2019. In October, the company announced it would acquire Baylis Medical Company Inc. for $1.75 billion, expanding its electrophysiology and heart product portfolios (see Frank Baylis).

In June 2022, the business announced it would acquire M.I.Tech Co., Ltd., of South Korea, for around $230 million. In August, Boston announced it would acquire Obsidio, Inc.

Boston Scientific
Precision Vascular Systems, Inc. (Acq 2004)
Advanced Bionics Corporation (Acq 2004)
Advanced Stent Technologies, Inc. (Acq 2004)
TriVascular, Inc. (Acq 2005)
CryoVascular Systems, Inc. (Acq 2005)
Nemo I Acquisition, Inc.
Rubicon Medical Corporation (Acq 2005)
Guidant (Acq 2006 and split between Boston and Abbott Laboratories)
CryoCor, Inc. (Acq 2008)
Labcoat Limited (Acq 2009)
Asthmatx, Inc. (Acq 2010)
Atritech, Inc. (Acq 2011)
Intelect Medical, Inc. (Acq 2011)
Sadra Medical, Inc. (Acq 2011)
Cameron Health (Acq 2012)
BridgePoint Medical, Inc. (Acq 2012)
Rhythmia Medical, Inc. (Acq 2012)
Vessix Vascular, Inc. (Acq 2012)
Bard EP (Acq 2013)
IoGyn, Inc. (Acq 2014)
Bayer (Interventional business, Acq 2014)
Endo International (Urology business, Acq 2015)
Xlumena, Inc. (Acq 2015)
Cosman Medical, Inc. (Acq 2016)
EndoChoice Holdings, Inc. (Acq 2016)
Distal Access, LLC (Gynecology and Urology business, Acq 2016)
Symetis SA (Acq 2017)
Apama Medical Inc. (Acq 2017)
nVision Medical Corporation (Acq 2018)
NxThera (Acq 2018)
Securus Medical Group, Inc. (Acq 2018)
Cryterion Medical, Inc. (Acq 2018)
Veniti, Inc. (Acq 2018)
Augmenix, Inc. (Acq 2018)
Claret Medical, Inc. (Acq 2018)
BTG plc (Acq 2018)
British Technology Group (Merged 1981)
National Research Development Corporation (NRDC) (Est. 1948)
National Enterprise Board (NEB) (Est. 1975)
Protherics Plc (Acq 2008)
Biocompatibles (Acq 2011)
Galil Medical (Acq 2016)
Novate Medical (Acq 2018)
Millipede, Inc. (Acq 2018)
Vertiflex, Inc. (Acq 2019)
Preventice Solutions, Inc. (Acq 2021)
Lumenis Ltd (Acq 2021)
Farapulse, Inc (Acq 2021)
Devoro Medical, Inc. (Acq 2021)
Baylis Medical Company Inc (Acq 2021)
M.I.Tech Co., Ltd (Acq 2022)
Obsidio(Acq 2022)

Organizational culture
BSC has been assessed favorably by its employees. In Glassdoor annual Best Places to Work – Employee's Choice Survey, BSC earned scores of:
 2018: #35 (of 100). 4.4 stars (of 5).
 2019: #56 (of 100). 4.3 stars (of 5).
 2022: #52 (of 100). 4.3 stars (of 5).
The feedback for this survey is given by current and former employees. As of 2018, BSC had 43% women among its employees, 38% among management positions, and 23% among corporate top management positions (data for US workforce, as of 2018).

Social commitment
Boston Scientific has set a standard for implementing an integrative organizational culture and states that it actively strives to further improve this by, among other things, increasing diversity among its employees – and in particular, among its managers, executives, and directors. To this end, the company has set itself the following goals in 2018:
 Leadership role by belonging to the top 10 companies in the integration of employees of the following groups: women, people of color, disabled persons and members of the LGBTQ community.
 Increase the proportion of people of color with supervisor or managerial functions to 20% in the USA including Puerto Rico (end of 2018: 19.6%, +1.8% compared to 2017).
 Increase the proportion of women in supervisor or managerial positions to 40% worldwide (end of 2018: 38.4%, +1.0% against 2017).

Success for these objectives has been chronicled and ranked by publications and organizations, including:
 Forbes added the company in 2019 to its list of Best Employers For Diversity for its efforts to foster a corporate culture that welcomes and supports all employees. That year, BSC ranked 85th out of 500 companies. Forbes included BSC in its 2021 and 2022 lists as well – ranking it 6th in 2021 and 171st in 2022, out of 500 for both years.
 Bloomberg recognized BSC for its inclusion in the Gender-Equality Index in 2019, which includes companies that publicly demonstrate their commitment to equality and the advancement of women in the workplace. The index lists a total of 230 companies from ten economic sectors and 36 countries and regions.
 The US magazine Working Mother, in 2017, listed BSC, for the first time, along with 9 other companies, as one of the "100 Best Companies for Working Mothers." The publication, again, listed BSC in 2018, 2019, and 2020. The magazine ceased publication in 2021.
 The Human Rights Campaign ("HRC") named BSC as a Best Place to Work for LGBTQ Equality in its 2019 edition of the eponymous list. HRC has given BSC a ranking of 100 (of 100) every year from 2015 through 2022 in its annual CEI Index (Corporate Equality Index) rankings of Fortune 1000 companies.
 The journal, US Black Engineer & Information Technology (USBE & IT), in its "2021 Top Supporters of HBCU Engineering," ranked BSC No. 6 among the "Top 20 Industry Supporters."

Litigation

Johnson & Johnson patent litigation
Beginning in 2003, Boston Scientific and Johnson & Johnson were involved in a series of litigations involving patents covering heart stent medical devices. Both parties claimed that the other had infringed upon their patents. The litigation was settled once Boston Scientific agreed to pay $716 million to Johnson & Johnson in September 2009 and an additional $1.73 billion in February 2010.

It was announced in November 2014 that Johnson & Johnson would have another chance for payback after a multibillion-dollar trial was set for November 20, 2014. A New York federal court judge would hear the case without a jury to decide whether Boston Scientific should be held liable for the contract breach.

Transvaginal mesh
Boston Scientific is one of several manufacturers of a medical device called transvaginal mesh, a type of surgical mesh used to treat pelvic organ prolapse. Experts concluded that the medical company had used cheap, counterfeit resin, which was both toxic and degraded when exposed to oxygen. When this was announced on 60 Minutes, Boston Scientific responded by saying the broadcast was "irresponsible and misleading," citing a 2017 Food and Drug Administration (FDA) report stating that although they found variability in the polypropylene resin, "these differences do not present new safety or effectiveness concerns." One woman, who sued in 2011, was awarded $100 million. Two operations had failed to remove all the parts of the mesh and she was still in pain. The company appealed the decision and had the amount reduced to $10M. In 2015, Boston Scientific announced it would pay $119 million to 2,970 lawsuit plaintiffs, who had been injured by the mesh. On March 23, 2021, the company agreed to pay $189 million to settle allegations that it had seriously misrepresented the risks related to the vaginal mesh. As of Jan. 27, 2021, around 54,000 lawsuits related to transvaginal meshes had been filed against Boston Scientific.

In April 2019, the FDA ordered Boston Scientific and Coloplast to remove all of their vaginal mesh products from the United States market.

In 2020, Johnson & Johnson was required to pay $344 million for failing to disclose the serious product risks of its transvaginal mesh product.

NIR stent 
In 2005, Boston Scientific paid $74 million to settle allegations that it had continued to sell NIR stents (flexible stents) after learning that many of them were defective. Twenty-six injuries and one death may have been caused by malfunctioning stents.

Defective defibrillators 

In 2011, Guidant, a subsidiary of Boston Scientific, was criminally convicted of a failure to report defibrillator safety problems to the FDA. The company was forced to pay more than $296 million in criminal fines and had to submit to the supervision of the U.S. Probation Office for three years. Even though Guidant knew the devices were defective, they continued to sell the defibrillators anyway. Guidant LLC had also advised its sales representatives to tell physicians that nothing was wrong with the defibrillators, and told the FDA that the proposed corrections were not being done to correct life-threatening device flaws, but were rather to improve process throughout. Not until three deaths had occurred and ten months had passed did the company reveal the defects in 2005. The directives for these wrongdoings had been implemented prior to Boston Scientific’s acquisition of Guidant in 2006.

In 2013, BSC and three of its subsidiaries – Guidant LLC, Guidant Sales LLC, and Cardiac Pacemakers, Inc. – agreed to pay $30 million to settle allegations that, according to the Justice Department, between 2002 and 2005, Guidant knowingly sold defective heart devices to health care facilities that in turn implanted the devices into Medicare patients.

Bribery allegations 

In 2009, Boston Scientific agreed to pay $22 million to settle allegations that its subsidiary Guidant LLC had used kickback schemes to boost sales for its pacemakers (cardiac rhythm management or CRM devices) and defibrillators (implantable cardioverter-defibrillators or ICD devices). Allegedly, Guidant paid doctors between $1,000 and $1,500 each to participate in one of its four post-studies known as RaCE ($1,500), RaCE II ($1,000), RaCE III ($1,000), and MERITS ($1,000).

Financial restatement 
On November 3, 1998, Boston Scientific restated its financial results for 1997, as well as its quarterly results for the first three quarters of 1998, due to the occurrence of business irregularities in the operations of its Japanese subsidiary.

Notable people

Locations

Headquarters and regional centers
 World headquarters: Marlborough, Massachusetts
 Europe headquarters: Voisins-le-Bretonneux, France
 Asia Pacific headquarters: Boston Scientific Asia Pacific Pte Ltd., Singapore
 U.S. Government Affairs office: Washington, D.C.
 Latin America headquarters: Weston, Florida

Manufacturing plants 
 California
 San Jose
 Valencia
 Spencer, Indiana
 Minneapolis–Saint Paul area
 Arden Hills
 Maple Grove
 Penang, Malaysia
 Coyol, Alajuela, Costa Rica
 Heredia, Costa Rica
 Dorado, Puerto Rico
 Ireland
 Clonmel
 Cork
 Galway

Customer fulfillment centers 
 Quincy, Massachusetts
 Kerkrade, Netherlands
 Tokyo, Japan

Institutes for Advancing Science 
 Warsaw, Poland
 Minneapolis–Saint Paul area
 Arden Hills
 Maple Grove
 Huangpu District, Shanghai
 Japan
 Miyazaki
 Tokyo
 Paris, France
 Gurgaon, India
 Istanbul, Turkey
 Bryanston, Johannesburg, South Africa

In June 2022, Boston Scientific announced that it would invest $62.5 million in a manufacturing and supply chain facility in Johns Creek, Georgia, a suburb of Atlanta. In 2016, Boston Scientific had acquired EndoChoice, located in Alpharetta,  from its proposed Johns Creek facility.

Subsidiaries 
BSC, as of December 31, 2019, wholly owns or has a majority interest in all of the below mentioned entities.

 Acurate Industria e Comercio Ltda. (Brazil)
 American Medical Systems Europe B.V. (Netherlands)
 Apama Medical, Inc. (Delaware)
 Augmenix K.K. (Japan)
 Augmenix, Inc. (Delaware)
 Biocompatibles International Limited (England)
 Biocompatibles UK Limited (England)
 Biocompatibles, Inc. (Delaware)
 
 
 Boston Scientific (Thailand) Ltd. (Thailand)
 Boston Scientific (UK) Limited (England)
 Boston Scientific AG (Switzerland)
 Boston Scientific Argentina S.A. (Argentina)
 
 Boston Scientific Benelux NV (Belgium)
 Boston Scientific Canada Limited (Canada)
 Boston Scientific Ceska republika s.r.o. (Czech Republic)
 Boston Scientific Chile SpA (Chile)
 Boston Scientific Clonmel Limited, in liquidation (Ireland)
 Boston Scientific Colombia Limitada (Colombia)
 
 Boston Scientific Cork Limited, in liquidation (Ireland)
 Boston Scientific de Costa Rica S.R.L. (Costa Rica)
 Boston Scientific de Mexico, S.A. de C.V. (Mexico)
 Boston Scientific del Caribe, Inc. (Puerto Rico)
 Boston Scientific do Brasil Ltda. (Brazil)
 Boston Scientific Far East B.V. (Netherlands)
 Boston Scientific Gesellschaft m.b.H. (Austria)
 Boston Scientific Group plc (Ireland)
 Boston Scientific Hellas S.A. (Greece)
 Boston Scientific Hong Kong Limited (Hong Kong)
 Boston Scientific Iberica, S.A. (Spain)
 Boston Scientific India Private Limited (India)
 Boston Scientific International B.V. (Netherlands)
 Boston Scientific International Finance Limited (Ireland)
 Boston Scientific International S.A. (France)
 Boston Scientific Ireland Limited, in liquidation (Ireland)
 Boston Scientific Israel Ltd. (Israel)
 
 Boston Scientific Korea Co., Ltd. (Korea)
 Boston Scientific Lebanon SAL (Lebanon)
 Boston Scientific Limited (England)
 Boston Scientific Limited (Ireland)
 Boston Scientific Ltd./Boston Scientifique Ltee. (Canada)
 
 Boston Scientific Medical Device Limited (Ireland)
 Boston Scientific Medizintechnik GmbH (Germany)
 Boston Scientific Middle East FZ-LLC (UAE)
 Boston Scientific Middle East SAL (Offshore) (Lebanon)
 Boston Scientific Nederland B.V. (Netherlands)
 
 Boston Scientific New Zealand Limited (New Zealand)
 Boston Scientific Nordic AB (Sweden)
 Boston Scientific Peru S.A.C. (Peru)
 Boston Scientific Philippines, Inc. (Philippines)
 Boston Scientific Polska Sp. z o.o. (Poland)
 
 Boston Scientific Pty Ltd (Australia)
 Boston Scientific Romania S.R.L. (Romania)
 Boston Scientific S.A.S.(France)
 Boston Scientific S.p.A. (Italy)
 
 Boston Scientific Services Private Limited (India)
 
 
 Boston Scientific Uruguay S.A. (Uruguay)
 
 Bravo Bidco Limited (England)
 
 
 BTG Australasia Pty Ltd (Australia)
 BTG Europe B.V. (Netherlands)
 BTG IM Holdings Ltd. (Israel)
 BTG International (Holdings) Limited (England)
 BTG International Asia Limited (Hong Kong)
 BTG International Canada Inc. (Canada)
 BTG International Germany GmbH (Germany)
 BTG International Healthcare Inc. (Delaware)
 BTG International Healthcare Limited (Delaware)
 BTG International Healthcare LLC (Delaware)
 BTG International Inc. (Delaware)
 BTG International Limited (England)
 BTG Limited (England)
 BTG Management Services Limited (England)
 BTG Medikal Limited Sirketi (Turkey)
 
 
 Claret Medical, Inc. (Delaware)
 
 Cryterion Medical, Inc. (Delaware)
 Cryterion Medical Ireland, Limited (Ireland)
 EKOS LLC (Delaware)
 Electron Acquisition Corporation (Delaware)
 EMcision International Inc. (Canada)
 EndoChoice GmbH, in liquidation (Germany)
 EndoChoice Holdings, Inc. (Delaware)
 
 EndoChoice Innovation Center Ltd. (Israel)
 EndoChoice Israel Ltd. (Israel)
 
 Galil Medical Inc. (Delaware)
 Galil Medical Ltd. (Israel)
 Galil Medical UK Limited (England)
 
 Guidant Europe NV (Belgium)
 Guidant Puerto Rico B.V. (Netherlands)
 Hong Kong Medtech Trading Limited (Hong Kong)
 Millipede, Inc. (Delaware)
 Notebook Merger Sub, Ltd. (Delaware)
 Novate Medical Limited (Ireland)
 nVision Medical Corporation (Delaware)
 NXT Merger Corp. (Delaware)
 NxThera, Inc. (Delaware)
 PneumRx GmbH (Germany)
 PneumRx Liimited (England)
 PneumRx LLC (Delaware)
 Protherics Medicines Development B.V. (Netherlands)
 Protherics Medicines Development Limited (England)
 Protherics UK Limited (England)
 Provensis Limited (England)
 PT Boston Scientific Indonesia (Indonesia)
 RMI Acquisition Corp. (California)
 
 Roxwood Medical, Inc. (Delaware)
 
 Securus Medical Group, Inc. (Delaware)
 SNS Merger Corp (Delaware)
 Special K Merger Corp. (Delaware)
 StarMedTec GmbH, in liquidation (Germany)
 Stream Enterprises LLC (Delaware)
 Symetis SA (Switzerland)
 
 Veniti, Inc. (Delaware)
 Vertiflex, Inc. (Delaware)
 Zuma Investment Pty Ltd (Australia)
 34 Biomedical Merger Corp. (Delaware)
 9357-1867 Quebec Inc. (Canada)

Bibliography

Notes

References 

 

 
 

 

 
 

  Originally retrieved April 19, 2019.
 
 
 

  Retrieved July 6, 2022.
 
 

 
 
 
 
 
 
 
 
 
 
 

  , ; .

 
 
 
 
 
   (article).
   (article).

 

 

  ; ; .
 

   (publication);  (article);  (article) (alternate access →  via )
 
 

 
 
 
 
 

 

   (print ed.).

  .
 

 A common surgical implant has generated the largest multi-district litigation since asbestos. 60 Minutes reports on one of the device's manufacturers, Boston Scientific, now facing 48,000 lawsuits.
  ;  (print); .()
   (US Newsstream database).

  .

 

 
 
 
 

 
 

  .

 
 
 

 
 
 
 
 
 
 

 
 
 

 
 

  (alternate access →  US Newsstream database).

External links
 

 

 
Companies listed on the New York Stock Exchange
Manufacturing companies based in Massachusetts
American companies established in 1979
Technology companies established in 1979
Health care companies based in Massachusetts
Companies based in Middlesex County, Massachusetts
Marlborough, Massachusetts
Life science companies based in Massachusetts
Implants (medicine)
Medical technology companies of the United States
Health care companies established in 1979
Technology companies based in Massachusetts
1979 establishments in Massachusetts
1992 initial public offerings
American brands